Centralia High School may refer to:

Centralia High School (Illinois)
Centralia High School (Kansas)
Centralia High School (Missouri)
Centralia High School (Centralia, Washington)